The Winnipeg School Division is a school division in Winnipeg, Manitoba. With 78 schools, it is the largest of six public school divisions in Winnipeg, as well as the largest and oldest school division in Manitoba.

Its schools collectively teach over 33,000 students, in central, pre-unicity Winnipeg.

Current schools

There are currently 78 schools in the Winnipeg School Division.

Elementary schools 
Elementary schools include those from preschool to grade 6.

Middle school and mixed-grade schools 
These are middle schools (aka junior high), or a combination of elementary and middle school (typically preschool to grade 9) or middle to high school (typically grades 7 to 12).

High school and adult learning

French-immersion programs 
French-immersion programs are taught in either:

 "milieu" schools, where French immersion is the only program taught in the school, and immersion starts at the Nursery level; or 
 dual track schools, where both English and immersion programs are taught in the same school and immersion starts at Kindergarten.

The immersion program option is offered in the following schools:

Former schools

Governance
Policies regarding the provision of educational services in WSD are the responsibility of the Board of Trustees of the Winnipeg School Division. The Winnipeg School Division comprises nine wards, each having one elected trustee, who are elected for a four-year term.

The 2020-2021 year includes the following trustees (with trustee for Ward 3 and 4 yet to be determined): Ward 5 seat has been vacated, after the previous trustee was removed by the Division's board of trustees. Seats for Ward 3, 4, and 5 may be filled during the upcoming civic election expected on October 26, 2022.

 Jamie Dumont (Vice-chair) — Ward 1
 Chris Broughton — Ward 2
 Yijie (Jennifer) Chen — Ward 6
 Arlene Reid — Ward 7
 Betty Edel (chairperson) — Ward 8
 Linda Schatkowsky — Ward 9

See also
List of school districts in Manitoba
Daniel McIntyre

References

External links
Winnipeg School Division 

Education in Winnipeg
School divisions in Winnipeg